Platycleis albopunctata is a species of European bush cricket in the tribe Platycleidini.

This species occurs throughout Europe and in North Africa; several subspecies have been described (below).  The nominate subspecies occurs in the British Isles where it is often called the grey bush cricket.

Description and Biology

In mainland Europe, grey bush crickets can be confused with the very similar to P. grisea. Their habitat includes areas with low and dry vegetation, such as sunny slopes and sandy open fields. The primary colour of the body is greyish to brownish, often with reddish brown elements on the upper side of the head and neck. The wings are long.

P. albopunctata is omnivorous, eating both plants and smaller insects. The males can be fairly aggressive and attract mates with a song consisting of a rather weak "zirr".

Subspecies
The Orthoptera Species File lists:
 P. albopunctata albopunctata (Goeze, 1778)
 P. albopunctata collina Navás, 1924 - Iberian peninsula
 P. albopunctata cretica Willemse & Kruseman, 1976
 P. albopunctata hispanica Zeuner, 1941 - France, Iberian peninsula
 P. albopunctata maura Zeuner, 1941 - N Africa
 P. albopunctata monticola (Chopard, 1924) -  Corsica
 P. albopunctata sculpta Zeuner, 1941 - Iberian peninsula
 P. albopunctata transiens Zeuner, 1941
 P. albopunctata yerseyana Zeuner, 1940 - France

Gallery

References

External links
 
 

Orthoptera of Europe
Tettigoniidae
Insects described in 1778